The Aviation and Air Defence Command of the Defence Forces, (formerly  Georgian Air Force (sak’art’velos sahaero dzalebi)) is the air force of the Defense Forces of Georgia. It was established as part of the Georgian Armed Forces in 1992 and merged into Army Air Section in 2010. As part of reforms in the Georgian military, the Air Force was reestablished as a separate command of the Defense Forces in 2016.

History

Founding and abolition
The Georgian Air Force and Air Defense Division was established on January 1, 1992. On August 18, 1998, the two divisions were unified in a joint command structure and renamed the Georgian Air Force.

The first combat flight was conducted by Izani Tsertsvadze and Valeri Nakopia on September 19, 1992, during the separatist war in Abkhazia. This date was later designated as the Georgian Air Force Day.

In 2010, the Georgian Air Force was abolished as a separate branch and incorporated into the Georgian Land Forces as Air and Air Defense sections.

Reestablishment and modernization
The Georgian Air Force was formally re-established in 2016 but all fixed wing aircraft were left abandoned till 2020. Under the leadership of Georgian Minister of Defense Irakli Garibashvili the Air Force was re-prioritized and aircraft owned by the Georgian Air Force are being modernized and re-serviced after they were left abandoned for 4 years. The Minister of Defense also announced plans to acquire strike drones to increase Georgia's combat readiness.

Ranks

Commissioned officer ranks
The rank insignia of commissioned officers.

Other ranks
The rank insignia of non-commissioned officers and enlisted personnel.

Mission and objectives
The objectives of the Georgian Air Force are defined as follows:
 Warfare and mobilization readiness of the Air Forces sub-units
 Protection of sovereignty and control of the air space of Georgia
 The fight against air terrorism
 Participate in the fight against terrorism on land and at sea
 Air defence of state entities and troops
 Destruction of land and naval targets at the enemy's front line and tactical inmost. Providing air support for friendly land and naval forces
 Participation in collective and multinational exercises.

Functions of the Georgian Air Forces:
 Troop and cargo transportation
 Search and rescue of downed aircraft and pilots
 MEDEVAC
 Informing the leadership of the Air Force and the Army about enemy air assaults
 Destruction of enemy manpower, land and naval targets
 Air forces landing
 Aerial reconnaissance

The two major airfields are located near Tbilisi at Vaziani and Marneuli.

Current inventory

References 

Air forces by country
Military of Georgia (country)
Military units and formations established in 1991
Military units and formations disestablished in 2010
1991 establishments in Georgia (country)
Military units and formations established in 2016
2010 disestablishments in Georgia (country)
2016 establishments in Georgia (country)